The German word Leder means and corresponds to English word leather. As a surname, it may refer to:

 Johann Heinrich Leder, established the Lichte porcelain (GmbH) in Lichte Thuringia
 Herbert J. Leder
 Mimi Leder, film director
 Philip Leder
 Nirenberg and Leder experiment, named after him
 Marc J. Leder, American businessman and Republican donor
 Stephan Hermlin, born Rudolf Leder

Other uses include:

 Leder, a fictional character in Mother 3.

See also 
 Lederer

es:Leder